Tumbbad is a village located on the banks of Jagbudi River in Ratnagiri district's Ratnagiri taluka in Maharashtra's Konkan division. The village is about 100 kilometres away from the Koyna Wildlife Sanctuary.
The village is famous for Mugger Crocodiles.

In popular culture 
Tumbbad, a 2018 Hindi-language historical period fantasy horror film is named after the village Tumbbad of Maharashtra. The film was also shot in the Tumbbad village.

See also 
 Tumbbad (film)
 Ratnagiri district

References 

Villages in Ratnagiri district